Biston thoracicaria is a moth of the family Geometridae. It is found in China (Beijing, Hebei, Shandong, Henan, Shaanxi, Gansu, Jiangsu, Zhejiang, Hubei, Yunnan), Russia, Japan, North Korea and South Korea.

References

Moths described in 1884
Bistonini
Moths of Japan